The 2016–17 South Alabama Jaguars men's basketball team represented the University of South Alabama during the 2016–17 NCAA Division I men's basketball season. The Jaguars were led by fourth-year head coach Matthew Graves and played their home games at the Mitchell Center in Mobile, Alabama as members in the Sun Belt Conference. They finished the season 14–18, 7–11 in Sun Belt play to finish in ninth place. They lost in the first round of the Sun Belt tournament to Coastal Carolina.

Previous season
The Jaguars finished the 2015–16 season 14–19, 8–12 in Sun Belt play to finish in a tie for seventh place. They defeated Georgia Southern in the first round of the Sun Belt tournament to advance to the quarterfinals before losing to Louisiana–Lafayette.

Off-season

Departures

Incoming transfers

Incoming recruits

Roster

Schedule and results

|-
!colspan=9 style=| Europe Tour

|-
!colspan=9 style=| Exhibition

|-
!colspan=9 style=| Non-conference regular season

|-
!colspan=9 style=| Sun Belt regular season

|-
!colspan=9 style=| Sun Belt tournament

See also
 2016–17 South Alabama Jaguars women's basketball team

References

South Alabama Jaguars men's basketball seasons
South Alabama
2017 in sports in Alabama
2016 in sports in Alabama